Ilana Davidson is an American operatic soprano who has had an active international singing career in operas and concerts. She has sung on several recordings, including as a soloist on a recording of William Bolcom's  Songs of Innocence and of Experience with Leonard Slatkin and the University of Michigan chorus and orchestra which won four Grammy Awards including Best Classical Album in 2006. She is the co-artistic director of the Chamber music series ClassicalCafe.

Early life and education
Raised in the Philadelphia, Pennsylvania region, she graduated from Carnegie Mellon University with a Bachelor of Music degree in vocal performance. She then pursued graduate studies at the Curtis Institute of Music  where she earned a M.M. in Opera Performance and Voice. She appeared in several opera productions at Curtis, portraying such roles as the young girl in Viktor Ullmann's Der Kaiser von Atlantis, Despina in Wolfgang Amadeus Mozart's Così fan tutte, Lady with a Hand Mirror in Dominick Argento's Postcard from Morocco, and Atalanta in George Frideric Handel's Serse.

Davidson was a vocal fellow at the Tanglewood Music Center where she was a pupil of Phyllis Curtin. She was the recipient of a William Matheus Sullivan Music Foundation Grant. She is also a participant in the Aston Magna Early Music Academy.

Career
She sang Papagena for her European debut at the Staatsoper Stuttgart.

Davidson made her debut at Carnegie Hall as a soloist in William Bolcom's Songs of Innocence and of Experience under the baton of the composer with the St. Louis Symphony. She made her debut at the Jugendstiltheater in Vienna as Die Königen in Krenek's Das Geheime Königreich. She sang the role of Gepopo in Ligeti's Mysteries of the Macabre in Amsterdam and also in concert with conductor Jonathan Sheffer and his Eos Orchestra at the New York Society for Ethical Culture.  She performed the role of Amor in the first modern revival of Giovanni Legrenzi's La divisione del mondo at the Schwetzingen Festival.

Davidson was the soprano soloist in Johann Sebastian Bach's Es erhub sich ein Streit, BWV 19 with the Orchestra of Saint Luke's and the New York Baroque Soloists under conductor Mary Greer. She later performed with both groups again as the soprano soloist in Handel's Messiah and Bach's Christmas Oratorio.

Davidson was a soloist in William Bolcom's Songs of Innocence and of Experience under the baton of the composer with the University of Michigan orchestra and chorus; a performance that was recorded by Naxos Records. She performed in the world premiere of Libby Larson’s Everyman Jack at the Sonoma Opera. She portrayed The Wife in the New York premiere of Philip Glass and Robert Moran's The Juniper Tree at Avery Fisher Hall.

Davidson performed in a concert of Ernst Krenek’s compositions at the Austrian Cultural Forum in New York City. In 2015 she performed the world premiere of Juantio Becenti's The Obsidian Morning at the New York Festival of Song. She also appeared at the Bard Music Festival with the American Symphony Orchestra as Mona Ginevra in Max von Schillings’s opera Mona Lisa.

Davidson has made several appearances with the Dutch National Opera during her career, including Amor in Gluck's Orfeo ed Euridice, Chef der Gepopo in Ligeti's Le Grand Macabre, the first Flowermaiden in Parsifal, Oscar in Un ballo in maschera, and Susanna in Le Nozze di Figaro. She has also made appearances at the Florida Grand Opera (Flora in The Turn of the Screw and Amore in L'incoronazione di Poppea'') and the Glimmerglass Opera.

References

External links
Official Website Ilana Davidson

Living people
American operatic sopranos
Carnegie Mellon University alumni
Curtis Institute of Music alumni
Year of birth missing (living people)